Wāsiṭī (also anglicized as Wasity or Wasti) is a toponymic surname originating from the city of Wasit, Iraq. Twelver Shias in India and Pakistan descending from Zayd ibn Ali also carry the surname along with Zaidi (see Zaidi Wasitis). Notable people bearing the name include:

Abu Bakr Muhammad ibn Ahmad al-Wasiti, 11th-century Arab writer
Yahya ibn Mahmud al-Wasiti, 13th-century Arab painter and calligrapher
Hamza El Wasti, Moroccan professional footballer
Rizwan Wasti (1937–2011), Pakistani radio broadcaster
Tahira Wasti (1944–2012), Pakistani writer
Nasir Wasti (1967–2006), Pakistani cricketer
Wajahatullah Wasti (born 1974), Pakistani cricketer
Laila Wasti (born 1977), Pakistani actress
Maria Wasti (born 1980), Pakistani actress

See also
 Vashti (disambiguation)
 Wasit (disambiguation)
 Zaidi (disambiguation)

Toponymic surnames
People from Wasit Governorate
Nisbas
Arabic-language surnames
Urdu-language surnames
Indian surnames
Surnames of Indian origin
Shi'ite surnames
Twelver Shi'ism